Lancaster Township is one of ten townships in Jefferson County, Indiana, United States. As of the 2010 census, its population was 1,511 and it contained 635 housing units.

History
Eleutherian College and the Lyman and Asenath Hoyt House are listed on the National Register of Historic Places.

Geography
The streams of Middle Fork Creek and Turkey Branch run through this township.

Cities and towns
 Dupont

Unincorporated towns
 Lancaster
 Middlefork

Extinct towns
 Five Points

Adjacent townships
 Bigger Township, Jennings County (north)
 Monroe Township (east)
 Madison Township (southeast)
 Smyrna Township (south)
 Graham Township (southwest)
 Lovett Township, Jennings County (west)
 Montgomery Township, Jennings County (west)

Cemeteries
The township contains five cemeteries: Bland, Clashman, College Hill, Nelson and Ogden.

Major highways
  Indiana State Road 7
  Indiana State Road 250

References
 
 United States Census Bureau cartographic boundary files

External links
 Indiana Township Association
 United Township Association of Indiana

Townships in Jefferson County, Indiana
Townships in Indiana